Universitas YARSI is a private Islamic university located in Cempaka Putih, Central Jakarta.

History
Universitas YARSI was established by the Islamic Hospital Foundation of Indonesia ( or YARSI) on 15 April 1967. Its status changed to YARSI Medical School of Jakarta in 1969.

Once YARSI was established as a medical school, the founders created a new faculty, from 1988 to 1999 three faculties were established, Faculty of Economics, Faculty of Law, Faculty of Industry Technology (now the Faculty of Information Technology). At the same time the YARSI Medical School of Jakarta was changed to the Faculty of Medicine and all four faculties became Universitas YARSI.

In 2007 YARSI added the Faculty of Psychology. In 2012 YARSI added the School of Dentistry.

Faculties
YARSI has five faculties and nine departments/schools. All have been accredited BAN-PT except from the Department of Library and Information Science (D3) and Psychology Health Sciences which are still in the process of accreditation.

 Faculty of Medicine
 School of Medicine
 School of Dentistry
The Dentistry Studies Program has been operating since November 2012, with the number of students of the first batch of 42 persons. The Dentistry Studies Program is part of the Faculty of Medicine. The results of the accreditation of the BAN-PT, Faculty of Medicine, University YARSI rated "A".

The staff of the Dentistry Studies program has 16 lecturers with the qualifications of the Professor of Periodonsia, three PhD (two Community Dentistry and Oral Biology / orthodontist), eight doctors Dental Specialists (two Oral Medicine Dental Specialist, two Conservative Dental Specialist, two Prosthodontist,  one Orthodontist, one Oral Surgeon) and four Senior Dentists with the educational qualification of Sustainable Dentistry.

The Dentistry Studies program is equipped with twelve tutorial rooms, dental lab, lecture hall, auditorium, free wifi, digital library, journal subscriptions free online from EBSCOhost, a collection of books for dentistry, and others to support dental education.

 Faculty of Economics
 Department of Management (Conventional and Islamic)
 Department of Accounting (Conventional and Islamic)
 Faculty of Law
 Department of Law
 Faculty of Information Technology
 Department of Informatics Technic
 Department of Library and Information Science
 Department of Library and Information Science (D3)
 Faculty of Psychology
 Department of Health Psychology

Postgraduate Programme
S2 for Economics
S2 for Law

External links
  Universitas YARSI Official website

Central Jakarta
Universities in Jakarta
Private universities and colleges in Jakarta
1967 establishments in Indonesia